Little Gloria... Happy at Last is a 1982 American-British biographical drama television miniseries directed by Waris Hussein and written by William Hanley, based on the 1980 book of the same name by Barbara Goldsmith. It stars Lucy Gutteridge as socialite Gloria Morgan Vanderbilt and Angela Lansbury as her sister-in-law, Gertrude Vanderbilt Whitney, with Bette Davis, Christopher Plummer, Maureen Stapleton, Martin Balsam, Barnard Hughes, Glynis Johns, John Hillerman, Michael Gross, and Joseph Maher in supporting roles.

The miniseries received generally positive reviews from critics and six Primetime Emmy Award nominations, including Outstanding Drama Special and acting nods for Lansbury and Davis. It also earned Gutteridge a Golden Globe Award nomination for Best Actress in a Miniseries or Television Film.

Plot
Based on the book by Barbara Goldsmith, it tells the story of the real-life heiress Gloria Vanderbilt and how her parents met and married. Gloria Vanderbilt was left a very rich girl at the age of eighteen months when her father died. When Gloria was ten, her mother, Gloria Morgan Vanderbilt, contested the child's custody with little Gloria's aunt, launching one of the most notorious court cases of the last century.

Cast
 Lucy Gutteridge as Gloria Morgan Vanderbilt
 Angela Lansbury as Gertrude Vanderbilt Whitney
 Bette Davis as Alice Gwynne Vanderbilt
 Maureen Stapleton as Nurse Emma Kieslich
 Martin Balsam as Nathan Burkan
 Glynis Johns as Laura Fitzpatrick Morgan
 John Hillerman as Maury Paul
 Michael Gross as Gilchrist
 Jennifer Dundas as Little Gloria
 Rosalyn Landor as Thelma Morgan
 Leueen Willoughby as Consuelo Morgan
 Christopher Plummer as Reginald Claypoole Vanderbilt
 Ken Pogue as Judge James Aloycious Foley
 Barnard Hughes as Judge John Francis Carew
 Joseph Maher as Smythe

Release
Little Gloria... Happy at Last aired on NBC on October 24 and 25, 1982.

Awards and nominations

References

External links
 

1982 American television series debuts
1982 American television series endings
1982 British television series debuts
1982 British television series endings
1980s American drama television series
1980s American television miniseries
1980s British drama television series
1980s British television miniseries
American biographical series
Parenting television series
Courtroom drama television series
Period family drama television series
Television series about families
Television series about widowhood
Television series set in the 1920s
Television series set in the 1930s
Television series by Metromedia
Television shows based on biographies
Television shows set in New York City
Television shows filmed in New York City
English-language television shows
Cultural depictions of socialites
NBC original programming
Vanderbilt family